Dupnitsa, or Dupnica ( (previously )), is a town in Western Bulgaria. Dupnitsa is the second largest town in Kyustendil Province.

History

The town has existed since ancient times. The German traveller Arnold von Harff visited Dupnitsa in 1499 and described it as a "beautiful town". The names Tobinitsa, Doupla and Dubnitsa are mentioned throughout history, the last one used until the Liberation of Bulgaria, when the official name was changed to Dupnitsa. In 1948 the town was renamed Stanke Dimitrov; for a short period in 1949 it was called Marek; the name was changed to Stanke Dimitrov in 1950. After the democratic changes, the old name Dupnitsa was restored.

On 15 October 1902, around 600 women and children fled to the vicinity of Dupnitsa from Macedonia from the attacking Turkish troops.

On a hill overlooking the town there is a giant cross, commemorating the Bulgarians who perished in the Balkan wars and World War I. On the same hill there lay the ruins of a medieval fortress.

During World War II over 4,000 Jews from parts of Greece and Yugoslavia annexed by Bulgaria were arrested on 4 March 1943 and deported, some to an internment camp in Dupnitsa. Many of them were from Komotini and Xanthi. After 11 to 12 days in the Dupnitsa camp, on 18 – 19 March they were transferred by train to Lom on the Danube for extermination at Treblinka. As part of the Bulgarian Commissariat for Jewish Affairs's policy of deporting Jews, Dupnitsa also was between June 1943 and September 1944 the site of a ghetto for 1,624 Jews expelled from Sofia, even though there was ultimately no exterminations of Jews resident within Bulgaria's pre-war borders.

Nowadays Dupnitsa is a fast-developing town combining new buildings with modern architecture with its historical monuments. Because of its beautiful location at the foot of the Rila mountain, the town is marvelous holiday destination. One of the main branches of industry is the pharmaceutical company Actavis (formerly HeFeKa, in Bulgarian ХФК), which gives employment to about 30 to 40 percent of the citizens. Small business is developing rapidly due to the town's economic growth.

Dupnitsa is famous for its cultural festivals. From 1 May to 2 June many festivals are held in the town due to the richness of the Bulgarian holiday calendar. The nightlife is very well developed. There are a lot of local pubs and clubs where young people meet and have fun. A few other popular places for socializing are the recently refurbished Town Park and the Town Garden (Градска градина, Gradska gradina).

In recent years the town has become notorious due to the activities of an organised crime group led by pair of Bulgarian gangsters, former policemen Angel Hristov and Plamen Galev, known as the "Galevi brothers". Using intimidation and extortion, and with the help of corrupt policemen, they controlled Dupnitsa to the extent that they have been described as "the owners of the first private town in Bulgaria". Hristov and Galev are fugitives after having been sentenced to five and four years respectively but are still believed to control the town.

Population
According to the 2021 census, the population of Dupnitsa is 28,333 people.

Ethnic linguistic and religious composition 

According to the 2011 census data, ethnic identity was distributed as follows:
Bulgarians: 29,099 (92.0%)
Roma: 2,333 (7.4%)
Others: 102 (0.3%)
Indefinable: 106 (0.3%)
 Undeclared: 1,879 (5.9%)
Total: 33,519

Some Aromanians live in Dupnitsa. An Aromanian cultural organization is present in the town.

Sport

Marek Dupnitsa is the football club representing the town. Marek was a dominant force in Bulgarian football in the mid-late 1970s, finishing 3rd in the domestic league, and winning the National Cup. The team played with success in Europe, defeating at home powerhouses such as Bayern Munich, Aberdeen and Ferencvaros.

The Volleyball club Marek Union - Ivkoni is from the town. Dupnitsa also has strong traditions in chess, kick-boxing, baseball.

Name

The names Tobinitsa, Doupla and Dubnitsa are used throughout its history. Dubnitsa survived until the Liberation of Bulgaria, when the official name was changed to Dupnitsa. In 1948 the town was renamed Stanke Dimitrov; in 1949 it was called Marek; the name was once again changed to Stanke Dimitrov in 1950. After the "democratic changes," the name Dupnitsa was restored.

Dupnitsa is located at an altitude of 500 m in a valley, surrounded by hills. Its location, as seen from above, resembles a hole (дупка, dupka in Bulgarian), hence the name Dupnitsa. There are five rivers flowing in the vicinity.

Dupnitsa is referred to as "The Green and Shady Town", because of its location which makes it quite shady in summer and due to the abundance of trees in the town. Dupnitsa is called "The Little Italy of Bulgaria". This nickname comes from the fact that many inhabitants have gone over the years to work and live in Italy and every summer they return to their home town (see: Bulgarians in Italy). Another nickname of the town is "the town of pharmacy".

Sister cities

 Bryansk, Russia

Honour
Dupnitsa Point on Smith Island, South Shetland Islands is named after Dupnitsa.

Gallery

Notable people
 (-1811), Bulgarian rabbi
Ana Maleshevska (1871–1942) – Bulgarian teacher, revolutionary and political activist
Aaron Aaronov - opera singer;
Asen Tcholakov – revolutionary, activist of VMRO
Georgi Ikonomov (1822–1865/7) – key figure of the National Revival period of Bulgaria
Georgi Kitov (1943–2008) - archeologist
Georgi Nadzhakov (1896–1981) - Dean of Sofia University "St. Kl. Ohridski" (1945–1952), physicist, "the father of the Xerox copier", academic
Ivan Bozhilov (1940–2016) – historian, professor
Lyubomir Dyakovski (b. 1951) – opera singer, father of Ludmila Dyakovska (co-founder of "No Angels" pop-band from Germany)
Nikola Drenski (1898–1944) – Bulgarian colonel
Nikola Lazarov (1880–1900) – Bulgarian revolutionary, member of VMORO
Patricki Sandev (1882 - 1959) born in Kazanlak and spent most of his life in Dupnitsa. 
Plamen Oresharski, former Prime Minister of Bulgaria, born in Dupnitsa.
Tsvetan Sokolov – Bulgarian volleyball player
Ventsislav Mutafchiyski (b. 1964) - military doctor and Head of the National Operational Headquarters for Fight with Coronavirus Pandemic in Bulgaria
Voin Voinov (b. 1959) – director-choreographer, organizer of South-Western International Folklore Festival "Peace on the Balkans", Honorary Citizen of Dupnica 
Yane Sandanski, Bulgarian revolutionary and political activist (born in Vlahi, moved to Dupnica as a child)
Alexander Drenski – athlete 
Alzek Misheff – painter
Dimiter Biserov (1840–1886) – Bulgarian educationalist and bookman, aide of Vasil Levski, founder of the Dupnica Revolutionary Committee, initiator of the first women's classes at the schools in Dupnica Region
Dimiter Kirov (1935–2005) – writer, journalist, public figure
Dimiter Yanakiev - saviour of The Samara Flag (Samarsko Zname, Самарското знаме)
Elitsa Vasileva – volleyball player, captain of the National Team of Bulgaria
Ferario Spasov (b. 1962) – footballer, coach
Hristaki Pavlovich Dupnitschanin (Христаки Павлович Дупничанин) (1804–1848) – key figure from the Revival period, educationalist
Hristo Dyukmedzhiev (1847–1905) – Mayor of Plovdiv
Hristo Krantov – educationalist 
Hristo Todorov (1814–1888) – educationalist
Ivan Chaprashikov (Иван Чапрашиков) - known as the biggest tobacco trader in Bulgaria, money-lender, politician, President of the town council of Gorna Dzhumaia (Blagoevgrad) during the interim Russian military governance, town councilor of Dupnitsa after the war, co-founder of the Democratic Party, food supplier for the King's court, philanthropist
Lea Ivanova – pop singer 
Leo Conforti – actor
Nevena Kokanova – actress 
Sashka Vaseva – singer
Stefan Todorov (partisan nickname Stanke Dimitrov - Marek) (1889–1944) – activist of the Communist Party
The Bulgarian writer Dimitar Dimov – spent years living in Dupnitsa
Vasil Demirevski (Zhelyu Demirevski) (1914–1944) – activist of the Bulgarian Communist Party (БКП)
Vasil Manov (Василий Манов) (-d. 1947) - landlord, major tobacco trader, with offices in Dupnitsa, Vienna, Thessaloniki, Alexandria and Konstantinopolis; Financial supporter of the Liberation Movement, war veteran, participated in the Siege of Adrianople ("Battle of Odrin", today's Edirne), donor of churches and monasteries in South-Western Bulgaria and Greece
Zhak Aseov (Jaques Aseoff) – big tobacco producer and wealthy citizen

References

External links

 Official Dupnitsa Municipality
 Dupnica News Web portal for Dupnica town.
 Dupnica Issues Report a problem related to Dupnitsa town.

 
Aromanian settlements in Bulgaria